Dato James Chan Khay Syn (born 1 June 1950) was the fourth Mayor of Council of the City of Kuching South.

Career
Chan previously worked as General Manager of Harwood Timber Sdn Bhd, a subsidiary of the Sarawak Timber Industry Development Corporation (STIDC).

Chan succeeded Chong Ted Tsiung, the third mayor of Kuching South City, who died on 3 August 2007. Chan was sworn in as mayor on 4 June 2008, before he could fully recover from his knee surgery. Mayor Chan is known to be a "hands on" Mayor as he constantly visit sites and markets such as Stutong Market to understand the situation and problems faced by people.

In late 2018, it was announced that Chan's term, due to expire on 31 December 2018, was extended until 31 August 2019.

Honours
  :
  Commander of the Order of the Star of Sarawak (PSBS) - Dato (2012)

References

External links
 Kuching South City Council website

21st-century Malaysian politicians
Malaysian people of Chinese descent
Living people
1950 births
People from Kuching
Malaysian people of Hakka descent